This article lists important figures and events in Malayan public affairs during the year 1952, together with births and deaths of significant Malayans.

Incumbent political figures

Central level
 Governor of Malaya :
 Vacant (until 15 January)
 Sir Gerald Templer (from 15 January)
 Chief Minister of Malaya  :
 Tunku Abdul Rahman Putra

State level
  Perlis :
 Raja of Perlis : Syed Harun Putra Jamalullail 
 Menteri Besar of Perlis : Raja Ahmad Raja Endut
  Johore :
 Sultan of Johor : Sultan Ibrahim Al-Masyhur
 Menteri Besar of Johore :
 Vacant (until 18 February)
 Syed Abdul Kadir Mohamed (from 18 February)
  Kedah :
 Sultan of Kedah : Sultan Badlishah
 Menteri Besar of Kedah : Mohamad Sheriff Osman
  Kelantan :
 Sultan of Kelantan : Sultan Ibrahim
 Menteri Besar of Kelantan : Nik Ahmad Kamil Nik Mahmud 
  Trengganu :
 Sultan of Trengganu : Sultan Ismail Nasiruddin Shah
 Menteri Besar of Trengganu : Raja Kamaruddin Idris
  Selangor :
 Sultan of Selangor : Sultan Sir Hishamuddin Alam Shah Al-Haj
 Menteri Besar of Selangor : Raja Uda Raja Muhammad
  Penang :
 Monarchs :
 King George VI (until 6 February)
 Queen Elizabeth II (from 6 February)
 Residents-Commissioner : Robert Porter Bingham
  Malacca :
 Monarchs :
 King George VI (until 6 February)
 Queen Elizabeth II (from 6 February)
 Residents-Commissioner : 
  Negri Sembilan :
 Yang di-Pertuan Besar of Negri Sembilan : Tuanku Abdul Rahman ibni Almarhum Tuanku Muhammad 
 Menteri Besar Negri Sembilan :
 Abdul Aziz Abdul Majid  (until 1 October)
 Abdul Malek Yusuf (from 1 October)
  Pahang :
 Sultan of Pahang : Sultan Abu Bakar
 Menteri Besar of Pahang : Tengku Mohamad Sultan Ahmad 
  Perak :
 British Adviser of Perak : Ian Blelloch
 Sultan of Perak : Sultan Yusuf Izzuddin Shah
 Menteri Besar of Perak : Abdul Wahab Toh Muda Abdul Aziz

Events
 17 March – The Pan-Malayan Religious-Studies Teachers Union was formed.
 24 March – Civil Defence Department was established for carrying out the provisions of the Ordinance.
 29 May – Houses of Parliament (Privileges and Powers) Act 1952 was enacted.
 30 May – The Rubber Trade Association of the Federation of Malaya was formed.
 31 May–1 June – 1952 Thomas Cup. Malaya won this edition, defeating United States.
 June – The Labour Party of Malaya was founded by Lee Moke Sang.
 3 July – Royal Military College (Malaysia) was established.
 November – The Dangerous Drugs Act 1952 was enacted.
 21 November – The Education Ordinance 1952 was enacted.
 22 November – An ordinance on Immigration Law was passed to consolidate the law relating to and further regulate immigration into the Federation of Malaya.
 6 December – Local municipal election were held in six municipal and town councils in the Federation of Malaya.
 Unknown date – The Alliance Party (Malaysia) was founded.
 Unknown date – The Malaysian Amateur Radio Transmitters' Society was founded.
 Unknown date – Construction began on Melaka International Airport, the main airport in Malacca.
 Unknown date – Simpang Airport was built and served as the main airport in Kuala Lumpur until it was replaced by Subang International Airport in 1965

Births 
 28 February – Raja Nadzatul Shima – First son of Sultan Idris Shah and Raja Muzwim
 23 March – Anita Sarawak – Singer and host
 1 April – Poh Ah Tiam, politician, businessman and community leader (died 2007)
 30 May – Abdul Rahman Bakar – Politician
 21 July – Ahmad Husni Mohamad Hanadzlah – Politician
 11 August – Aida Khalida – Actor
 9 September – Hasbullah Awang – Sport commentator (died 2015)
 15 October – Ramli Sarip – Singer
 3 December – Wan Azizah Wan Ismail – Politician and wife of Anwar Ibrahim
 25 December – Isa Bakar, football player (died 2010)
 26 December – Reduan Abdullah – Footballer
 Unknown date – Ahmad Busu – Actor (died 2013)
 Unknown date – Hatta Azad Khan – Film director
 Unknown date – Sulaiman Yassin or Mat Over – Actor and comedian

Deaths

See also 
 1952
 1951 in Malaya | 1953 in Malaya
 History of Malaysia

References 

 
Years of the 20th century in Malaysia
Malaya
Malaya
Malaya